Phylloscirpus is a genus of flowering plants belonging to the family Cyperaceae.

Its native range is Ecuador to Western Argentina.

Species
Species:

Phylloscirpus acaulis 
Phylloscirpus boliviensis 
Phylloscirpus deserticola

References

Cyperaceae
Cyperaceae genera